Ashraf Abouelhassan Mahmud (born 17 May 1975) is an Egyptian indoor volleyball player. He was included in the Egypt men's national volleyball team that finished 11th at the 2000 Summer Olympics in Sydney, Australia. He is setter and is 184 cm tall. He plays for Zamalek

Clubs
Current –  Ahly Benghazi
Debut –  Zamalek

References

External links
 FIVB profile: Ashraf Abouelhassan
 

1975 births
Living people
Egyptian men's volleyball players
Volleyball players at the 2000 Summer Olympics
Volleyball players at the 2008 Summer Olympics
Olympic volleyball players of Egypt
Volleyball players at the 2016 Summer Olympics